Voyage of the Damned is a 1976 film based on historic events of Jewish refugees unable to find safe harbor in 1939.

Voyage of the Damned may also refer to:
"Voyage of the Damned", a 1997 Frasier episode
"Voyage of the Damned", a 2007 Doctor Who Christmas episode

See also 
Village of the Damned (disambiguation)